A yeoman was a member of an English social class, generally a freeman who owned his, or her,  own farm. The term was also used in North America.

Yeoman or yeomen may also refer to:

Military
Yeoman (United States Navy), a rating in the United States Navy dealing with administrative and clerical work
Yeoman (F), a World War I-era United States Naval rating for women
A rating in the United States Coast Guard dealing with administrative and clerical work
, the name of more than one ship of the British Royal Navy
A member of the Yeomanry, the volunteer cavalry regiments of the British Army
Yeoman of signals, a signals petty officer in the Royal Navy or a senior communications specialist in the British Army

Places
Yeoman, Indiana, a town in the United States
Yeoman Island, Canada

Sports teams
Yeoman Football Club, an Australian rules football club based in Burnie, Tasmania, Australia
Yeoman Cricket Club, merged in 1989 to form Burnie/Yeoman Cricket Club, representing Burnie, Tasmania
Yeomen, the sports teams of Oberlin College, Ohio, United States, whose mascot is the Yeoman
Yeomen, the sports teams of York University, Canada, whose mascot was the Yeoman

Other uses
Chevrolet Yeoman, a station wagon
The Yeomen (band), 1960s band from New Zealand
Yeoman (surname)
Yeoman Aviation, an Australian company set up to produce agricultural aircraft, such as the Yeoman Cropmaster
Yeomans, butterflies of India
Yeoman (software), a set of tools for building web applications
Yeoman (hill), a categorisation of British hill
Yeoman (household servant)

See also
Yeomen of the Guard, the royal bodyguard of England
The Yeomen of the Guard, a Gilbert and Sullivan opera
Yeomen Warders, of the Tower of London, England
Butterflies of the genus Cirrochroa
Yeomans (disambiguation)
Youmans, a surname
Eoman (disambiguation)